Robert Misrahi (born 3 January 1926) is a French philosopher who specialises in the work of 17th Century Dutch thinker Baruch Spinoza.

Biography
Born in Paris to Turkish-Jewish immigrants, Misrahi studied at the University of Paris (Sorbonne), where he became a protege of Jean-Paul Sartre. He is currently the emeritus professor of ethical philosophy at the Université de Paris I (Sorbonne), he has published a number of works on Spinoza and published the essentials of his work on the question of happiness. He has published a number of works in publications including Les Temps modernes, Encyclopædia Universalis, Le Dictionnaire des philosophies "PUF", but also Libération and le Nouvel Observateur.

In 1974 he was the doctoral advisor of future UN High Commissioner for Human Rights, Sérgio Vieira de Mello. 

In November 2002, he published a polemic in the columns of Charlie Hebdo, regarding a book by controversial Italian journalist Oriana Fallaci, la Rage et l'Orgueil. 

During his studies at the Sorbonne, Misrahi also became involved with the militant Zionist group Lehi, which was then conducting an insurgency in Palestine against the British. Misrahi was recruited to carry out an attack on British soil. During a March 1947 visit to London, Misrahi placed a bomb in the Colonial Club, a recreational facility for students and soldiers from British colonies in Africa and the West Indies. The bomb, which detonated on March 7, 1947 blew out the facility's doors and windows and seriously injured several soldiers.

Works 
 La condition réflexive de l'homme juif, Julliard, 1963
 Spinoza, Choix de textes et Introduction, Seghers, 1964
 Martin Buber, philosophe de la relation, Seghers, 1968
 Lumière, commencement et liberté, Plon, 1969 ; Seuil, 1996
 Le Désir et la réflexion dans la philosophie de Spinoza, Gordon and Breach, 1972
 Marx et la question juive, Gallimard, 1972
 La philosophie politique et l'Etat d'Israel, Mouton, 1975
 Traité du bonheur : 1, construction d'un Château, Seuil, 1981, 1995 ; Celtic knot, 2006
 Traité du bonheur : 2, éthique, politique et bonheur, Seuil, 1984
 Traité du bonheur : 3, les actes de la joie, PUF, 1987, 1997 (Réédied Encre marine, 2010)
 Ethique, de Spinoza, Traduction, Introduction, Commentaires et Index de Robert Misrahi, PUF, 1990, 1993 ; editions de l'Eclat, 2005
 Le Corps et l'esprit dans la philosophie de Spinoza, synthélabo, les Empêcheurs de penser en rond, 1992
 Spinoza, Grancher, 1992
 Le bonheur, Essai sur la joie, Hatier, 1994
 La problématique du sujet aujourd'hui, encre marine, 1994
 La signification de l'éthique, Synthélabo - les Empêcheurs de penser en rond, 1995
 Existence et Démocratie, PUF, 1995
 La jouissance d'être : Le sujet et son désir, essai d'anthropologie philosophique, encre marine, 1996, 2009
 Les figures du moi et la question du sujet depuis la Renaissance, Armand Colin, 1996
 L'être et la joie, Perspectives synthétiques sur le spinozisme, encre marine, 1997
 Qu'est-ce que l'éthique ?, Armand Colin, 1997
 Spinoza, Armand Colin, 1998
 Qu'est-ce que la liberté ?, Armand Colin, 1998
 Qui est l'autre ?, Armand Colin, 1999
 Désir et besoin, Ellipses, 2001
 100 mots pour construire son bonheur, Le Seuil - les Empêcheurs de penser en rond, 2004
 100 mots sur l'Ethique de Spinoza, Le Seuil - les Empêcheurs de penser en rond, 2005
 Spinoza, Médicis-Entrelacs, 2005
 Le philosophe, le patient et le soignant, Les Empêcheurs de penser en rond, 2006
 Le Travail de la liberté, Le bord de l'eau, 2008
 Savoir vivre. Manuel à l'usage des désespérés, entretien entre Hélène Fresnel et Robert Misrahi, encre marine, 2010

Participation 
 "Notice introductive à la Correspondance de Spinoza", in Œuvres complètes de Spinoza, texte traduit, présenté et annoté par R.Caillois, M.Francès et R.Misrahi, Gallimard - La Pléiade, 1954
 "La coexistence ou la guerre", in Le Conflit israélo-arabe, sous la direction de Jean-Paul Sartre, Les Temps modernes, June 1967
 "L'antisémitisme latent", in Racisme et société, sous la direction de C.Duchet et P.de Comarmond, Maspero, 1969
 "Pour une phénoménologie existentielle intégrale", in Questions à l'œuvre de Sartre, Les Temps modernes, 1990
 "Critique de la théorie de la souffrance dans l'ontologie de Schopenhauer", in Présences de Schopenhauer, sous la direction de Roger-Pol Droit, Grasset, 1991
 "Du bonheur, entretien avec Belinda Cannone", in Esprit, août-septembre 1998
 "De la mort et de l'attachement à la vie", in La fabrication de la mort, sous la direction de Ruth Scheps, interviews diffusées sur France Culture et éditées par les Empêcheurs de penser en rond, 1998
 "La Métaphysique de Spinoza" in Métaphysique, sous la direction de Renée Bouveresse, Ellipses, 1999
 "Le Bonheur. Signification. Difficultés et voies d'accès", in Philosopher 2, sous la direction de Christian Delacampagnc et Robert Maggiori, Fayard, 1999
 "Le libre désir", in '"ENTRE DÉSIR ET RENONCEMENT" - Marie de Solemne. Éd. Dervy, Éd. Albin-Michel

Bibliography 
"Le traité du bonheur de Robert Misrahi" par Fabrice Guého, revue "Cahiers philosophiques" No 25 CNDP
Article sur les ouvrages d'André Comte-Sponville et Robert Misrahi in Encyclopaedia Universalis, volume Universalia 1985. (fg)
Robert Misrahi ayant exprimé à Jean-Paul Sartre qu'étant juif en pleine Seconde Guerre mondiale il ne pouvait poursuivre des études de philosophie, Sartre financera les études de philosophie de Misrahi.

External links 
"La vraie joie", Temporel n°4 septembre 2007
"L'accès à l'autre", Conférence donnée le 7 Mars 2010

Notes and references 

1926 births
Living people
Writers from Paris
Academic staff of the University of Paris
French historians of philosophy
20th-century French Jews
20th-century French Sephardi Jews
Jewish philosophers
20th-century French philosophers
21st-century French philosophers
21st-century French writers
French male non-fiction writers
Lycée Louis-le-Grand teachers
Spinoza scholars
Spinozists
University of Paris alumni
French people of Turkish-Jewish descent